was a Japanese billiards player. A Time article from 1952 referred to Matsuyama as a Japanese Willie Hoppe. By 1952 Matsuyama's last visit to the United States was in 1936. Matsuyama coached Masako Katsura. Matsuyama died on December 20, 1953 from a heart ailment. Matsuyama had had plans to move to Honolulu with his family, become an American citizen, and purchase a billiard parlor. His eldest son, Hideo, 18, was attending a San Francisco high school at the time. Matsuyama was said to have taught all of Japan's top players, among whom Katsura was his star pupil.

References

 Grave of Matsuyama Kinrey

Japanese carom billiards players
1953 deaths
Year of birth missing
Place of birth missing